The men's C-2 500 metres event was an open-style, pairs canoeing event conducted as part of the Canoeing at the 1988 Summer Olympics program.

Medalists

Results

Heats
17 teams entered in three heats on September 26. The top three finishers from each of the heats advanced directly to the semifinals and the remaining eight teams were relegated to the repechages.

Repechages
Taking place on September 26, the top three finishers from each of the repechages advanced directly to the semifinals.

Semifinals
Three semifinals were held on September 28. The top three finishers from each semifinal advanced to the final.

Final
The final was held on September 30.

The Bulgarians false started from Lane 2 and the race had to be restarted.

References
1988 Summer Olympics official report Volume 2, Part 2. pp. 345–6. 
Sports-reference.com 1988 C-2 500 m results.
YouTube.com replay of the 1988 final. - accessed 13 August 2009.

Men's C-2 500
Men's events at the 1988 Summer Olympics